García I ( – 19 January 914) was the King of León from 910 until his death and eldest of three succeeding sons of Alfonso III the Great by his wife Jimena.

García took part in the government alongside his father until 909. In that year a conspiracy, in which García was implicated, was uncovered. Alfonso renounced the throne and divided the realm among his three sons. León went to García, Galicia to Ordoño, and Asturias to Fruela. Asturian primacy was nevertheless recognised.

García's reign saw the fortification of the Duero and the repopulation of Roa, Osma, Clunia, and San Esteban de Gormaz. During this period, the count of Castile, Gonzalo Fernández gained influence through these endeavours. At his death in Zamora he had no heirs and his kingdom passed to Ordoño.

García's wife, Muniadona, was said by Pelagius of Oviedo to have been daughter of Nuño Fernández, but this is chronologically impossible. Sánchez Albornoz suggested instead that she was daughter of Munio Núñez, the repoblador of Roa and Count of Castile. She may have been the same Muniadona later married to count Ferdinand Ansúrez of Castile.

References

10th-century Leonese monarchs
870s births
914 deaths
Year of birth uncertain
Beni Alfons
Sons of emperors